Erivelto is a given name. It may refer to:

 Erivelto (footballer, born 1954), Erivélton Martins, Brazilian football midfielder
 Erivelto (footballer, born 1982), Erivelto Alixandrino da Silva, Brazilian football forward
 Erivelto (footballer, born 1988), Erivelto Emiliano da Silva, Brazilian football forward

See also
 Erivelton (disambiguation)